Linwood Boulevard, Linwood, or 33rd Street is a major west/east main street that runs in Kansas City, Missouri from Broadway Boulevard to Van Brunt Boulevard.
Linwood is one of the few named east-west streets in the Kansas City grid south of the Missouri River.  It is one of the original boulevards designated by George Kessler's City Beautiful design in the late 19th century for Kansas City. It derives its name from the Linden trees.

Overview 
Two large historic districts on either side of the boulevard are on National Register of Historic Places—the Old Hyde Park Historic District between Central and Baltimore on the south side and the Santa Fe Place Historic District (on a section of the Santa Fe Trail) on the north between Indiana and Prospect.  Other National Register Places include the Ivanhoe Masonic Temple at 2301 East Linwood and the Kansas City Athenaeum at 900 East Linwood.

The boulevard lost much of its leafy charm in the 1930s when U.S. Route 40 City was routed down it.

In 1955, Ray Lamar opened his donut shop in a converted gas station at 240 East Linwood.  The LaMar's Donuts store remained a simple low-tech landmark on the boulevard even as branches expanded through the Midwest and it drew national attention from Jay Leno and Calvin Trillin.

Route 
 It passes Midtown Marketplace from Main Street to Gillham Road on Linwood.
 Stoplight, unusual signal made of cut-stone in the middle of the intersection designed by Edward Buehler Delk (1931), at Paseo Boulevard.
 It passes Linwood Shopping Center at Linwood and Prospect Avenue.
 It passes Central High School from Indiana Avenue to Cleveland Avenue on Linwood.

See also

 39th Street (Kansas City)
 Prospect Avenue (Kansas City, Missouri)
 Southwest Boulevard (Kansas City)
 The Paseo (Kansas City)

References

External links 
 kchistory.org article on the boulevard

Streets in Kansas City, Missouri
Boulevards in the United States